Thomas Sjöberg (born 6 July 1952) is a Swedish former professional footballer who played as a forward. A full international between 1974 and 1981, he won 45 caps for the Sweden national team and represented his country at the 1978 FIFA World Cup.

Club career 
Sjöberg played much of his career with Malmö FF in Allsvenskan during the 1970s. Already during his first season for Malmö FF, the club, much to his goal scoring capacity won the top Swedish football league, Allsvenskan in 1974, under English manager Bob Houghton. This was repeated the following season. When he then left for Karlsruher SC in the Bundesliga during the 1976-77 season, his former Swedish club only came second in Allsvenskan, behind Halmstad BK, which were led by another Englishman, Roy Hodgson. As Sjöberg returned to Malmö FF they won Allsvenskan again! So during four years, Malmö FF won Allsvenskan at three occasions, in which Sjöberg participated during the three "golden years" only. With Malmö FF he won Allsvenskan and became Swedish Champion in 1974, 1975 and 1977.

After scoring a goal for Sweden in the 1978 World Cup in Argentina against Brazil, the well bearded Sjöberg become interesting for an Arabian Sheik, who bought him for a club in Saudi Arabia. This became a rather short adventure for him, and likewise a shorter time in the old North American NASL league (not to be confused with current Major League Soccer) and a club from Chicago followed. This time he was absent from Malmö FF for less than 12 months. However he missed an indeed very important season for Malmö FF, and didn't participate in the club's most well known international achievement so far (also by summer of 2014), to reach the final of the European Cup in 1978-79 season. (which though was lost to Nottingham Forest by a single decider). He did though return to Malmö FF for a third time and for some more seasons. He ended his career in  Lunds BK.

International career 
Sjöberg was capped 45 times for the Sweden national football team and scored a goal against Brazil in the 1978 FIFA World Cup.

Coaching career 
He coached BSC Young Boys with Roland Andersson.

Career statistics

International 

Scores and results list Sweden's goal tally first, score column indicates score after each Sjöberg goal.

Honours 
Malmö FF

 Swedish Champion: 1974, 1975, 1977
 Svenska Cupen: 1973–74, 1974–75, 1977–78, 1979–80

Individual

 Stor Grabb: 1976

References

External links

NASL stats

1952 births
Living people
Swedish footballers
Sweden international footballers
1978 FIFA World Cup players
Malmö FF players
Ittihad FC players
Chicago Sting (NASL) players
Helsingborgs IF players
Karlsruher SC players
Sportspeople from Helsingborg
Allsvenskan players
Bundesliga players
Expatriate footballers in Germany
Expatriate footballers in Saudi Arabia
Expatriate soccer players in the United States
Swedish football managers
BSC Young Boys managers
Expatriate football managers in Switzerland
Swedish expatriate sportspeople in Germany
Swedish expatriate sportspeople in Switzerland
Swedish expatriate sportspeople in the United States
Swedish expatriate sportspeople in Saudi Arabia
Association football midfielders
North American Soccer League (1968–1984) players